Diaz Faisal Malik Hendropriyono (born 25 September 1978) is an Indonesian politician who currently serves as Special Staff to the President of Indonesia and chair of the Indonesian Justice and Unity Party since 2018. He is the third child of former national intelligence body head A. M. Hendropriyono.

References 

1978 births
Living people
Indonesian politicians
People from Jakarta